Oliwia Rzepiel (born 8 March 2001) is a retired Polish figure skater. She is the 2020 Reykjavik International silver medalist, and a two-time Polish national silver medalist (2018, 2020).

On the junior level, she is the 2015 Mini Europa silver medalist, the 2018 Polish junior national champion, and a two-time Polish junior national silver medalist (2016, 2019).

Personal life
Rzepiel was born on 8 March 2001 in Warsaw.

Career
Rzepiel began learning to skate in 2006 under Anna Hunkiewicz. Her current coach is Ilona Senderek-Wójcik. She debuted internationally in ISU Junior Grand Prix circuit in 2017.

Programs

Competitive highlights
JGP: Junior Grand Prix; CS: Challenger Series

References

External links

Oliwia Rzepiel at the Polish Figure Skating Association
Oliwia Rzepiel at Stats on Ice

2001 births
Living people
Polish female single skaters
Figure skaters from Warsaw